Alan Bersten (born 26 May 1994) is an American professional Latin and ballroom dancer. He was a contestant on the tenth season of So You Think You Can Dance and is currently a professional dancer and choreographer on Dancing with the Stars. He is the winner of season 28 of Dancing with the Stars with his celebrity partner, The Bachelorette star Hannah Brown.

Personal life 
Bersten was born and raised in Minnesota. His family heritage is Russian. He started dancing at the age of 7.

In 2018, Bersten was on tour with Dancing With The Stars when he began to have severe stomach pain. A blood test showed he had symptoms of a tumor on one of his parathyroid glands called hyperparathyroidism. He underwent surgery the next day to remove his left parathyroid. Bersten returned to work after only a week of recovery.

Dancing With The Stars

Performances 
Bersten started working on Dancing With The Stars in season 20 as a member of the troupe. He remained in that role for four more seasons until he made his debut as a professional partner in season 25.

During the second week of season 22, Bersten danced a salsa with Paige VanZant, as VanZant's regular partner, Mark Ballas, suffered a back injury during rehearsals. Bersten learned the entire dance routine on one day's notice and performed the dance for the live show the following day. In season 24, Bersten danced with Heather Morris for four weeks while Morris's regular partner, Maksim Chmerkovskiy, was recovering from an injury.

Bersten was promoted to a professional partner in season 25, where he was partnered with 1980s singer-songwriter and Broadway actress Debbie Gibson. The couple was eliminated in the second week and took 12th place. Bersten was also featured on the official promotional poster for the show that season alongside fellow cast member Sharna Burgess.

For season 26, Bersten was partnered with Olympic figure skater Mirai Nagasu. The couple was eliminated in the third week of competition, tying for 4th place with Chris Mazdzer and partner Witney Carson and Jennie Finch Daigle and partner Keo Motsepe.

For season 27, Bersten was partnered with model and social media personality Alexis Ren. The couple reached the finals and took 4th place.

For season 28, Bersten was partnered with The Bachelorette star Hannah Brown. The couple reached the finals and were crowned the season's champions on November 25, 2019.

For season 29, Bersten returned to compete again and is paired with Disney Channel star Skai Jackson. They were eliminated week 10, finishing in 5th place.

For season 30, Bersten was partnered with The Talk co-host and dancer Amanda Kloots. The couple reached the finals and finished in 4th place.

For season 31, Bersten was partnered with country music singer Jessie James Decker. They were eliminated week 6, finishing in 10th place.

Season 25 
With celebrity partner Debbie Gibson

Season 26 
With celebrity partner Mirai Nagasu

1 Score given by guest judge Rashad Jennings

2 Score given by guest judge  David Ross.

Season 27 
With celebrity partner Alexis Ren

Season 28 
With celebrity partner Hannah Brown

1 Score given by guest judge Leah Remini.

2 Score given by guest judge Joey Fatone.

Season 29 
With celebrity partner Skai Jackson

Season 30 
With celebrity partner Amanda Kloots

1 Derek Hough was absent so score was given out of 30.

2 Julianne Hough filled in for Derek Hough.

Season 31 
With celebrity partner Jessie James Decker

1 Score given by guest judge Michael Buble.

Dancing With The Stars: Juniors 
Bersten joined the first season of Dancing With The Stars spin-off series Dancing With The Stars: Juniors as a professional mentor. He formed Team Alan with junior professional dancer JT Church and 10-year-old professional skateboarder Sky Brown. Team Alan ended up winning the first ever Dancing With The Stars: Juniors Mirror Star trophy on December 9, 2018.

Awards and achievements

References 

1994 births
Living people
Dancing with the Stars (American TV series) winners
American male dancers
American people of Russian descent